Willis Clifford Cook (October 5, 1874 – January 4, 1942) was a United States diplomat and a politician in the State of South Dakota.

Biography
Cook was born to Alfred and Sarah Cook in Gratiot, Wisconsin. In 1899 he married Mary Butler Miller.

Career
Cook was County Judge of Aurora County, South Dakota from 1900 to 1902. Later he was a member of the South Dakota State Senate from 1905 to 1909. He was Chairman of the Republican Party of South Dakota from 1906 to 1912 and a Republican National Committeeman from 1916 to 1920. From 1921 to 1929 he was U.S. Minister to Venezuela.

See also
United States Ambassador to Venezuela
Members of the South Dakota State Senate

References

1874 births
1942 deaths
People from Gratiot, Wisconsin
Ambassadors of the United States to Venezuela
Republican Party South Dakota state senators
South Dakota state court judges
People from Aurora County, South Dakota